Pernick is a surname of Jewish origin, derived from the Belarusian word "pernik", which means "gingerbread". Notable people with the surname include:

Ron Pernick, American author
Solly Pernick (1898-1990), American stage technician